Mete Kaan Demir (born 13 May 1998) is a Turkish professional footballer who plays as a winger for Eyüpspor.

Professional career
On 31 January 2019, Demir signed his first professional contract with İstanbul Başakşehir for 3.5 years. Demir made his senior debut with Başakşehir in a 2-0 Süper Lig loss to Fatih Karagümrük on 25 September 2020.

References

External links
 
 
DFB Profile

1998 births
Sportspeople from Mainz
German people of Turkish descent
Living people
Turkish footballers
Turkey youth international footballers
German footballers
Association football wingers
Hannover 96 II players
İstanbul Başakşehir F.K. players
Eskişehirspor footballers
Eyüpspor footballers
Regionalliga players
Süper Lig players
TFF First League players